(The Exiles of Florence) is an opera semiseria in two acts by the Italian composer Ferdinando Paer. The libretto was by Angelo Anelli. The work is a form of 'rescue opera'.

The opera was first performed at the Hoftheater in Dresden on 27 November 1802.

Roles

Synopsis
The bandit Umberto holds Isabella prisoner, and her husband Edoardo attempts unsuccessfully to rescue her. Eventually Isabella is revealed as Umberto's daughter.

See also
 List of operas by Ferdinando Paer

References

Further reading
Balthazar, Scott L. (1992), "Fuorusciti di Firenze, I" in The New Grove Dictionary of Opera, ed. Stanley Sadie (London)

External links

Operas by Ferdinando Paer
Opera semiseria
Italian-language operas
1802 operas
Rescue operas
Operas